Sinek is a surname. Notable people with the surname include:

Charles Sinek (born 1968), American ice dancer
Simon Sinek (born 1973), British-American author